Karat Minaret a minaret and is about 25 km south of Taybad, Iran, in the village with the same name. It was built in Seljuk period.

References

National works of Iran
Minarets in Iran
Seljuk architecture
Buildings and structures in Razavi Khorasan Province
Tourist attractions in Razavi Khorasan Province